= 2026 Cumberland County, Maine District Attorney election =

Local election in Maine, US

2026 Cumberland County District Attorney election
- November 3, 2026
Candidate	Jackie Sartoris	Stephanie Anderson
Party	Democratic	Independent
district attorney before election
Jackie Sartoris
Democratic
Elected district attorney
Jackie Sartoris
Democratic

The 2026 Cumberland County, Maine District Attorney election was held on November 3, 2026, to elect the district attorney of Cumberland County, Maine. The primary election was held on June 9. Incumbent district attorney Jackie Sartoris was re-elected against former Republican district attorney Stephanie Anderson, who ran as an independent.

== Democratic primary ==
=== Candidates ===
==== Nominee ====
- Jackie Sartoris, incumbent district attorney

==== Eliminated in primary ====
- Valerie Adams, former prosecutor

=== Results ===
Democratic primary
Party	Candidate	Votes	%
Democratic	Jackie Sartoris (incumbent)	33,136	56.19
Democratic	Valerie Adams	25,831	43.81
Total votes		58,967	100.00

== Independents ==
=== Declared ===
- Stephanie Anderson, former Republican district attorney (1991–2018)

== General election ==
Sartoris has been viewed as a reform district attorney while in office. The police union is backing her challenger, Stephanie Anderson. Anderson announced her candidacy in April, and made it official following Sartoris' win in the primary election on June 9.

=== Results ===
2026 Cumberland County District Attorney election
Party	Candidate	Votes	%
Democratic	Jackie Sartoris (incumbent)		
Independent	Stephanie Anderson		
Write-in			
Total votes			100.00
